Justice Bennett may refer to:

Alfred S. Bennett (1854–1925), associate justice of the Oregon Supreme Court
Annabelle Bennett (born 1950), additional judge of the Supreme Court of the Australian Capital Territory
Elizabeth Bennett (judge) (fl. 1990s–2000s), justice of the Supreme Court of British Columbia
Granville G. Bennett (1833–1910), associate justice of the Supreme Court for the Dakota Territory
John E. Bennett (judge) (1833–1893), associate justice of the Arkansas Supreme Court, and later of the South Dakota Supreme Court
Milo Lyman Bennett (1789–1868), associate justice of the Vermont Supreme Court
Nathaniel Bennett (1818–1886), associate justice of the California Supreme Court

See also
Job Bennet Jr. (fl. 1750s–1760s), associate justice of the Rhode Island Supreme Court
Judge Bennett (disambiguation)